The 2022 Reigate and Banstead Borough Council election took place on 5 May 2022 to elect members to Reigate and Banstead Borough Council in England coinciding with other local elections. Fifteen of the council's 45 seats were up for election.

The Conservatives won eight of the fifteen seats available, retaining control of the council which they have held since 2000. The Green Party gained two seats, Horley East & Salfords and South Park & Woodhatch, from the Conservatives to remain the second-largest party. The only other seat to switch parties was Reigate which the Conservatives won from the independent incumbent Christopher Whinney.

Results summary

Ward results

Banstead Village

Chipstead, Kingswood and Woodansterne

Earlswood and Whitebushes

Hooley, Merstham and Netherne

Horley Central and South

Horley East and Salfords

Horley West and Sidlow

Lower Kingswood, Tadworth and Walton

Meadvale and St. John's

Nork

Redhill East

Redhill West and Wray Common

Reigate

South Park and Woodhatch

Tattenham Corner and Preston

References

Reigate and Banstead Borough Council elections
Reigate
2020s in Surrey
May 2022 events in the United Kingdom